The initials AEG are used for:

 Association of Environmental & Engineering Geologists
 Alderac Entertainment Group, an American game publisher
 Allgemeine Elektrizitäts-Gesellschaft (General Electricity Company), former German electrical manufacturer
The AEG brand is licensed to several companies; see AEG#The AEG brand today
 Anschutz Entertainment Group, an American entertainment company
 Automatic Electric Guns, a type of Airsoft gun
 Arctic Equestrian Games, an annual horse show held in Norway
 Double Eagle II Airport, Albuquerque, New Mexico, US; FAA LID: AEG)
 Aek Godang Airport, Padang Sidempuan, Indonesia (IATA code AEG)
 N-(2-aminoethyl)glycine, a backbone molecule of peptide nucleic acids
Annissa Essaibi George, an American Democratic Party politician
Thomas & Friends: All Engines Go, A reboot of the original Thomas & Friends series.